Lugovoy is a rural locality (a village) in Shangskoye Rural Settlement of Sharyinsky District, Kostroma Oblast, Russia. The population was 4 as of 2014.

History 
The village received this name in 1966.

Geography 
Lugovoy is located 15 km north of Sharya (the district's administrative centre) by road. Khmelevitsa is the nearest rural locality.

References

External links 
 Lugovoy on komandirovka.ru

Rural localities in Kostroma Oblast
Populated places in Sharyinsky District